Theta Nu Epsilon (commonly known as T.N.E.) is a sophomore class society.  Founded at Wesleyan University in 1870 as a chapter of Skull and Bones, the society accepts members regardless of their fraternity status.

Early history
Theta Nu Epsilon was founded on December 11, 1870 in Room Seven of Wesleyan’s South College by Herbert Hull Coston, Coleridge Allen Hart, George Washington Shonk, Lyman Horace Weeks, (all four Alpha Delta Phi), Benjamin Emmons Gerst, Arthur Collins McClay, George Bickford Davey Toy, (all four Delta Kappa Epsilon), Stephen Judson Kirby, George Henry Towle, Alfred Charles True, (all four Eclectic), George William Elliott, Charles Hamlin Furber, William Henry Lawrence, Olin Levings Livesey, (all four Psi Upsilon), Amos Howard Hoagland, (independent). Founded as the Wesleyan chapter of Skull & Bones, two years later the chapter cut its ties to Yale and changed the bones of the Skull & Bones emblem to keys.

Class societies were once common in northeastern American colleges and universities. There were freshman, sophomore, junior and senior class societies. Membership was by class year, and cut across the fraternity membership lines. Some class societies became fraternities outside the northeast; DKE and Alpha Sigma Phi were founded as class societies. Yale's Skull & Bones, Cornell's Quill and Dagger, and Theta Nu Epsilon were probably the most famous and successful class societies.
 
T.N.E. is a sophomore class society, and in a traditional type chapter, members were chosen near the end of their freshman or start of their sophomore year. Once selected, the new members were active and responsible for operation of the chapter during their sophomore year. As juniors and seniors, they were considered honorary members and only had authority in an advisory role. The society always excluded freshmen. From the beginning, the identities of the sophomore members were kept secret. In yearbooks, the names of the sophomores appeared in code. The Alpha chapter and legitimate chapters continue this traditional type. Several latter types of chapters developed over time: one type is that of the three-year society, adopted by chapters at many institutions without a class society system, a third type was as a feeder organization to a senior society, a fourth type was where the chapter acted as an interfraternity coordinating body, and a fifth type was as a wholly secret society, (which were usually chapters that had notorious reputations, such as the University of Alabama).

National organization
Theta Nu Epsilon had immediate success at Wesleyan, and it grew rapidly and spread throughout colleges across the United States. The Alpha chapter at Wesleyan acted as the national organization and continued to grant charters until 1907. The society's first convention was at the Delevan House hotel in Albany in 1885, and conventions were held annually thereafter.
A movement for a formal national organization resulted in a convention was held at the Hotel Astor in New York on March 29 and 30, 1907. The convention established a national governing body which was incorporated the society under the laws of the State of New York. The new national organization was given the authority to manage the national operations of TNE and grant new chapters.

Internal struggles
As early as the turn of the century, there were chapters created informally and without official sanction, especially in the South. The new national organization attempted to unify all chapters of the society, but the process proceeded slowly. Some illicit chapters became very problematic for the society. Several of these chapters were banned from campuses, and many fraternities prohibited members from accepting membership in the society. These events negatively affected the reputation of the society.

Also, because of internal differences in the society, in the 1910s, many of the older legitimate chapters reorganized themselves as independent organizations which were loosely allied across campuses.

In 1913, the National Interfraternity Conference (predecessor to the current North American Interfraternity Conference) officially announced its opposition to T.N.E. and recommended to the fraternities represented in the conference that they forbid their members to join Theta Nu Epsilon The relations between Theta Nu Epsilon and the N.I.C. improved and the N.I.C. retracted its opposition at its session in New York, 1925. Theta Nu Epsilon was later accepted as a member of the N.I.C. in the 1930s.

An attempt was made to convert a small portion of the then existing chapters into a four-year college fraternity in the 1930s. At the same time, some of the most notorious activity seems to have been among some illegitimate chapters in the far West in the late 1930s and 40s.
 
It is frequently assumed that all Theta Nu Epsilon members are also members of four-year college fraternities, but that has never been a requirement of membership. However, it is true that very many members have been members of four-year fraternities. There have been chapters that have operated exclusively that way, and the independent former chapter at Alabama is a well-known example of a group operating solely as an interfraternity coordinating organization.

Post WWII history
Although the national organization stopped operating in World War II, some of the chapters of that national continued into the late 1940s. Henry Kelly ultimately merged his efforts with the Alpha chapter.  Some, but not all, of these independent chapters began initiating women as members in the 1970s. The national organization of the Alpha chapter currently reports chapters at Wesleyan, the University of Missouri, the University of New Mexico, and the University of Virginia.

Several of the older chapters that separated in the early 1900s have survived as independent entities on their respective campuses. These include Skull & Keys at the University of California, Berkeley, Skull and Bones at Yale University, The Phoenix – S K Club at Harvard University, the Tejas Club at the University of Texas at Austin, The Machine at the University of Alabama, Skull Society at the University of Maine, Cap and Skull at Rutgers University, and a group using the T.N.E. name at the University of Nebraska.

Official chapters
Because of early splits in the national organization, several unofficial national coalitions and rogue groups granted their own charters. As a result, many conflicts exist surrounding the actual founding dates and chapter designations, even at the institutions that had officially recognized groups. The following list of chapters is composed of all chapters either founded by the Alpha, or founded by the successive nationals from 1907 to 1949, or made legitize after their original founding. Institution names have been modernized where necessary.
Alpha - Wesleyan University - 1870-current
Beta - Syracuse University - 1872-1925
Gamma - Union College - 1874-1925
Delta - Cornell University - 1877-1913
Epsilon - University of Rochester - 1878-1944
Zeta - University of California - 1879
Eta - Colgate University - 1880
Theta - Kenyon College - 1881-1964
Iota - Case Western Reserve University - 1881-1921
Kappa - Hamilton College - 1882
Lambda' - Williams College - 1882-1923
Lambda - Rensselaer Polytechnic Institute - 1881-1940
Mu - Stevens Institute of Technology - 1883-1935
Nu - Lafayette College - 1884
Beta Beta - Ohio Wesleyan University - 1884-1930
Xi - Amherst College - 1885-1925
Omicron' - Lehigh University - 1887-1907
Omicron - Allegheny College - 1887-1924
Pi' - Dickinson College - 1887
Pi - Pennsylvania State College - 1888-1940
Kappa Theta - University of Pennsylvania - 1888-1919
Alpha Rho - University of Alabama - 1888
Sigma - New York University - 1889 - 1972
Alpha Alpha (Indiana Alpha) - Purdue University - 1882-1992
Psi Omega - University of the South - 1890-1913
Alpha Phi - University of Mississippi - 1890-1929
Beta Beta - University of Iowa - 1890-1929
Tau - Wooster University - 1891-1923
Kappa Kappa - Northwestern University - 1891-1929
Phi - Rutgers University - 1892-1916
Upsilon - University of Michigan - 1892-1930
Delta Delta - University of Maine - 1893-1930
Chi - Dartmouth College - 1893-1925
Psi - Northwestern University - Established June 1893
Psi - Ohio State University - 1893-1931
Omega - Stanford University - 1893-1936
Alpha Epsilon - University of Minnesota - 1893-1934
Alpha Alpha - Bowdoin College - 1893-1930
Alpha Beta - University of Kansas - 1893-1929
Alpha Gamma - Duke University - 1914-1930
Alpha Delta - Illinois Wesleyan University - 1893-1925
Alpha Sigma - Washington & Lee University - 1894-1912
Alpha Zeta - University of Chicago - 1894-1934
Gamma Gamma - University of Wisconsin - 1894-1934
Gamma Gamma - Trinity College - 1894-1930
Omega - Swarthmore College - 1894-1913
Alpha Epsilon - University of Colorado - 1894-1929
Alpha Eta - University of Nebraska - 1894-1929
Epsilon Epsilon - Case Western Reserve University, Medical - 1895-1919
Alpha Theta - University of Missouri - 1895
Kappa Kappa - University of Texas - 1895-1929
Omega Omega - Georgia Institute of Technology - 1895-1955
Alpha Omicron - Cumberland University - 1896
Zeta Zeta - Indiana University - 1898-1924
Theta Theta - West Virginia University - 1898-1930
Kappa Gamma - University of Vermont Medical School - 1898-1914
Omicron Omega - Saint Lawrence University - 1898-1930
Mu Beta - Brown University - 1900-1930
Princeton - Princeton University - 1900-1902
Theta Tau - University of Illinois - 1901-1934
Alpha Omega - Columbia University - 1901-1930
Beta Omicron - Colby College - 1902-1930
Beta Mu - Emory University - 1902-1923
Sigma Alpha - Westminster College - 1902-1929
Beta Eta - Muhlenberg College - 1902-1912
Tau Tau - Baker University - 1902
Nu Mu - Auburn University - 1902-1929
Omicron Omicron - Ohio Northern University - 1903-1921
Pi Phi - University of Virginia - 1893
Pi Pi - Dickinson College of Law - 1903-1925
Lambda Sigma - Yale University - 1903-1930
Omega Nu - University of Maryland - 1904-1914
Phi Phi - University of Arkansas - 1904-1930
Zeta Phi - Boston University - 1904-1914
Kappa Rho - University of Maryland at Baltimore, (BCDS) - 1904-1929
Zeta Phi - Massachusetts Institute of Technology - 1904-1916
Omega Kappa - University of Maryland at Baltimore, Medical School. - 1904-1915
Sigma Rho - University of Georgia - 1904-1915
Sigma Phi - University of Tennessee Medical College - 1908-1929
Eta Eta - University of Massachusetts - 1909
Gamma Beta - Thomas Jefferson University - 1909-1928
Epsilon Deuteron - University of Rochester Alumni chapter, Theta Pi Sigma - 1909-1942
Zeta Zeta - University of Wyoming - 1910-1917
Rho Rho - Norwich University - 1910-1930
Sigma Tau - University of Maryland at Baltimore, Medical School. - 1910-1934
Nu Nu - Marquette University - 1911-1936
Xi Xi - University of Louisville - 1911-1935
Sigma Sigma - Virginia Medical College - 1911-1916
Upsilon Upsilon - New York University, Washington Square - 1912 - 1972
Psi Psi - Iowa State University - 1912-1935
Alpha Beta - University of Buffalo - 1914-1930
Alpha Gamma - Duke University - 1914-1930
Alpha Eta - Rush Medical College - 1915-1925
Alpha Epsilon - University of South Dakota - 1915-1929
Alpha Kappa - Northwestern University Dental School - 1916-1923
Beta Gamma - Chicago College of Dental Surgery - 1917-1925
Beta Epsilon - Oklahoma State University - 1917-1949
Delta Beta - Lehigh University - 1922-1925
Delta Lambda - University of Missouri at Kansas City  - 1922-1930
Delta Chi - University of Oklahoma - 1922-1934
Alpha Iota - Harvard University - 1895-1913, 1924-1928
Kappa Rho - University of Maryland at Baltimore - 1924-1929
Delta Phi - Lombard College - 1928-1930
Mu Mu - Coe College - 1928-1934
Alpha Mu - Southwestern University - 1928-1936
Chi Alpha - University of New Mexico - 1923 - 1949 rechartered on October 25, 2005 - current
Invictus - Vanderbilt University - 1923 - 1994 Rechartered in 2008 - Current

In popular culture
The T.N.E. emblem was featured on the album cover of E-40's gold-selling 2006 album My Ghetto Report Card.

References

External links
 "Wesleyan Argus", Wesleyan Argus, History of Theta Nu Epsilon and connection to Skull & Bones, October 10, 1987.
 "Theta Nu Epsilon", Official website of the Alpha chapter.
 "Outline history of Theta Nu Epsilon", (a view from one of the 1920s era splinter groups), Cecil Rhodes Walley, ca. 1930.
 "Fascism at U. S. C.", Time. May 28, 1945
 "Secret fraternity newsletters still circulating on UNL campus", Lincoln Journal Star. May 17, 2006
"Not For Four Years",Not For Four Years

1870 establishments in Connecticut
Collegiate secret societies
Secret societies in the United States
Student organizations established in 1870
Student societies in the United States